James Lawrence (7 March 1891–1970) was an English footballer who played in the Football League for Aston Villa and Coventry City.

References

1891 births
1970 deaths
English footballers
Association football defenders
English Football League players
Aston Villa F.C. players
Coventry City F.C. players